Below are the rosters for the UEFA U-17 Championship 2007 tournament in Belgium. 

Players' ages as of the tournament's opening day (2 May 2007).

Group A

Head coach: François Blaquart

Head coach: Paul Schomann

Head coach: Juan Santisteban

Head coach: Yuriy Kalitvintsev

Group B

Head coach: Bob Browaeys

Head coach: John Peacock

Head coach: Luka Kostić

Head coach: Albert Stuivenberg

Footnotes

External links
Report

UEFA European Under-17 Championship squads
Squads, 2007 Uefa European Under-17 Football Championship